KCQL (1340 AM, "Fox Sports Radio 1340") is a sports radio station licensed to Aztec, New Mexico in the Four Corners region.

The station is owned by iHeartMedia, Inc. under the name Capstar Partners, L.P.

Hosts on KCQL include Jim Rome, Chris Myers, J.T. the Brick, Ed Lacy, and Randy Simon.

Play-by-play action comes mainly from Westwood One and includes NFL football and the NCAA Division I men's basketball tournament.  There is also local sports action not otherwise specified on the station's official website, possibly high school sports.

External links
KCQL official website

CQL
Sports radio stations in the United States
Radio stations established in 1959
IHeartMedia radio stations
1959 establishments in New Mexico